Geyserville Unified School District is a public school district based in Sonoma County, California, United States.

References

External links
 

School districts in Sonoma County, California